Sowers may refer to:


Places 
 Sowers, Texas; ghost town in Dallas County near Dallas, Texas
 Sowers, Virginia; unincorporated community in Floyd County, Virginia
 Sowers Glacier, glacier in Ellsworth Land, Antarctica

People 
 Barbara Sowers (1932–2012), All-American Girls Professional Baseball League player
 George F. Sowers (1921–1996), American professor
 Jeremy Sowers (born 1983), American professional baseball player
 Katie Sowers (born 1986), American football offensive assistant
 Scott Sowers (born 1963), American actor
 Tommy Sowers (born 1976), American entrepreneur, academic and politician

Films 
 Sowers and Reapers, a lost 1917 silent film feature directed by George D. Baker
 The Sowers, a surviving 1916 silent film drama produced by Jesse Lasky

See also
 Sowing
 Sow (disambiguation)
 Sour (disambiguation)